The Man Who Wasn't There is a 1987 French thriller film directed by René Féret and based on Roderick MacLeish's novel The Man Who Wasn't There.

Plot
Charles Elaine goes from strength to strength. Famous actor, his career is progressing smoothly, with the advice of Strosser and daughter Isabelle, his lawyers. But someone in the shadows, wants his loss, lead to madness, crime, by applying his theories of a psychiatrist who "can make anyone crazy deftly manipulating" . False rumors, terminated, strange coincidences contracts, Rella, who attracts and refuses him any worries Charles. Soon, as he repeated the role of Macbeth is a tragedy that obsesses him, the fatal fall of his father in the cliffs of Cassis as a child that "one" uses. Staging, allusions come and go, to persuade him that he was responsible. Who has interest in destroying it? Alice, his sister? Alexander, his stepfather and Alice's father?

Cast
 René Féret as Charles
 Claude Jade as Alice
 Valérie Stroh as Rella
 Georges Descrières as Alexandre
 Jacques Dufilho as Strosser
 Sabine Haudepin as Isabelle Strosser

References

External links
 

1987 films
Films directed by René Féret
1987 thriller films
French thriller films
Films based on American novels
1980s French-language films
1980s French films